Mount Argus may refer to:
 Mount Argus, Antarctica, three-peaked mountain in Palmer Land, Antarctica
 Mount Argus monastery, Harold's Cross, Dublin, Ireland
 Charles of Mount Argus, monk based at the monastery

See also
 Argus Mountain, Vancouver Island, British Columbia, Canada
 Argus Range,  mountain range located in Inyo County, California, USA
 Argos Hill (disambiguation)
 Argus (disambiguation)